Beryl Penrose (22 December 1930 – 23 June 2021) was an Australian international tennis player. She competed in the Australian Open eight times, from 1950 to 1957. Penrose won the singles title in 1955 defeating compatriot Thelma Coyne Long in the final in straight sets.

In January 1948 she won the Australian girls singles title. In July 1952 she won the singles title at the Welsh Championship.

Her best results came in 1955, aged 24, when in addition to her Australian success, she reached the quarterfinals at the French and Wimbledon Championships. While overseas, Penrose reached four finals including winning the German Championships against Erika Vollmer.

She was rated as high as 5th in the world in the 1955 tennis rankings.

In 1957 she married and retired from her tennis career.

In 2017, she was inducted into the Australian Tennis Hall of Fame. Her grandson, James Duckworth, is an Australian tennis professional.

Grand Slam finals

Singles (1 win)

Doubles (2 wins, 2 losses)

Mixed doubles (1 win, 1 loss)

References

External links 
 

1930 births
2021 deaths
Australian female tennis players
Grand Slam (tennis) champions in girls' singles
Australian Championships (tennis) champions
Sportswomen from New South Wales
Tennis players from Sydney
Grand Slam (tennis) champions in women's singles
Grand Slam (tennis) champions in women's doubles
Grand Slam (tennis) champions in mixed doubles
Australian Championships (tennis) junior champions
20th-century Australian women